Joe Sedelmaier (May 31, 1933), born John Josef Sedelmaier, is an American film director known for his work in television advertising. His work includes FedEx's "Fast Talking Man" ads and the Wendy's "Where's the Beef?" ads.

Sedelmaier contended, "A commercial is something you watch when you sit down to watch something else--you should at least be entertained."

"Beginning in the 1970s, Sedelmaier, a former art director at Young & Rubicam and J. Walter Thompson, gained notice for fundamentally changing the way television spots were cast and filmed--replacing the actors who seemed like plastic, too perfect mannequins with offbeat people like Clara Peller. He directed them in a manner doing for television advertising what directors like Preston Sturges did for Hollywood comedies."—Stuart Elliott, New York Times 

His commercial work has garnered multiple Clio awards, Cannes Golden Lion Awards, and numerous awards for the One Show, the Art Directors Club of New York, Communication Arts, Britain's D&AD, and the Hollywood MBA. In 2000 he was inducted into the Art Directors Club of New York Hall of Fame. In 2016 he was inducted into the American Advertising Federation Advertising Hall of Fame. His film "OpenMinds" was an official selection at the 2003 Sundance Film Festival.

References

External links

 
 Short Bio at Adage.com
 Art Directors Club biography, portrait and images of work

Living people
Artists from Chicago
Advertising directors
1933 births
People from Orrville, Ohio